Back to School with Franklin is a 2003 Canadian animated comedy film. It is the third Franklin film and was released direct-to-video and on DVD. This animated film was directed by Arna Selznick.

Cole Caplan takes over for Noah Reid as the voice of Franklin the Turtle, ushering in the sixth season of the program, which would not make its way to the United States until 2006. He is joined by Bryn McAuley, who has voiced his sister Harriet since the first film and Carolyn Scott as the voice of a replacement teacher.

Plot 
The main plot focuses around Franklin Turtle and his friends starting a new year of school after a fun and relaxing summer, only to find out that their teacher Mr. Owl is absent because he got called away on a family matter. Their replacement teacher, Miss Koala from Australia, pulls up on a motorbike and at first Franklin finds her weird. She uses phrases such as "fair dinkum" and wants to create a brand-new soccer team. Soon, however, he and everyone else in the class are won over by her "can-do" attitude.

Meanwhile, Franklin's younger sister, Harriet is upset because her best friend (Franklin's best friend Bear's younger sister) Beatrice has gone to preschool, meaning that she cannot play with her most of the time on weekdays. Her spirits are raised when she meets Beaver's younger brother Kit (Amanda Soha), but Kit is a bit shy and may not be ready to play with her, especially after an accident on the slide results in them both getting injured.

Books and films can help calm first-time students. Franklin, Canada's kid-lit turtle star of many titles in both media outlets, can tell you about his experiences with that queasy tummy. However, unlike previous episodes on the re-occurring show. Within this special edition movie Franklin walked in excited to be back to school, but did not realize the number of changes that he would have to experience on his first day of the school year. Many students around the world, let alone the nation face these same fears of change.

Hence, this special edition is able to help students cope with their fears. Watching Franklin and his class overcome their fears of change and eventually accept the fact that they were going to have an interim teacher, is an aspect that many students are able to relate to when starting a new school year.

Many students starting at a new school fear that they are unable to create new friendships, or constantly feel bored because they do not have their friends that they are used to playing with. This aspect can also be related to the movie and Franklin's sister Harriet. Although Harriet had not started school yet, she was going through an emotional time knowing that her friend was starting school and not able to play with her during the day anymore. Harriet was quickly able recover from this by being introduced to Beaver's little brother Kit. She was still a little frustrated because their personalities did not match at first, however, they were quickly able to recover from this rough beginning to their friendship.

Franklin's characters morals and maturity can are also noticed in this episode when he hands over his favourite blue blanket to his little sister, to help keep her calm. These same values are then later noticed when she copies the actions of her brother to hand them to her new friend Kit during his troubles.

Voice Cast

Songs
Doin' Nuthin (Can Be a Busy Thing)! performed by Emilie-Claire Barlow, Dimitrius Matthews and Brittany Kay.

References

External links

 TV.com Guide
 

2003 direct-to-video films
2003 films
2003 animated films
Canadian direct-to-video films
Canadian children's animated films
Canadian animated feature films
Animated films based on children's books
Animated films based on animated series
Animated films about children
Animated films about turtles
Animated films about koalas
Animated films about friendship
Films about owls
Nelvana films
2000s children's animated films
Franklin the Turtle (books)
2000s English-language films
2000s Canadian films